The FantastICE Championship is a women's professional wrestling championship created and promoted by the Japanese promotion Ice Ribbon. The current champion is Akane Fujita.

Title history
Risa Sera was the inaugural champion. Sera's reign is also the longest at 322 days, while Rina Yamashita reign is the shortest at 187 days. Akane Fujita is the oldest champion when she won it at 35 years old while Sera is also the youngest champion at 28 years old.

The current champion is Akane Fujita, who won the title by defeating Rina Yamashita in a falls count anywhere match on the December 31, 2021 episode of New Ice Ribbon: Ribbonmania in Tokyo, Japan.

Combined reigns

References

External links
FantastICE Championship In English
 Official website

Ice Ribbon championships
Women's professional wrestling championships